Jackson's Action! is a live album by saxophonist Willis Jackson which was recorded in New York City in 1964 and released on the Prestige label. Three additional albums were released from the same performance Live! Action, Soul Night/Live!, and Tell It....

Reception

Allmusic awarded the album 3 stars.

Track listing 
All compositions by Willis Jackson except as indicated
 "Jackson's Action" - 3:10   
 "A Lot of Livin' to Do" (Charles Strouse, Lee Adams) - 6:55   
 "I Wish You Love" (Charles Trenet, Albert Beach) - 3:28   
 "Monkey Hips" - 5:20   
 "A'w Right-Do It!" - 6:00   
 "Jive Samba" (Nat Adderley) - 10:20  
Recorded at The Allegro in New York City on March 21, 1964

Personnel 
Willis Jackson - tenor saxophone
Frank Robinson - trumpet
Carl Wilson - organ
Pat Martino - guitar
Joe Hadrick  - drums

References 

Willis Jackson (saxophonist) live albums
1965 live albums
Prestige Records live albums